Ludovico Moresi (born 24 May 1980) is an Italian football midfielder who will move to AC Lugano in the summer of 2008.

External links
football.ch profile

1980 births
Living people
Italian footballers
FC Lugano players
S.S. Virtus Lanciano 1924 players
Swiss Super League players
A.S.D. Martina Calcio 1947 players
Association football defenders